The 2005 Subway Fresh 500 was the eighth stock car race of the 2005 NASCAR Nextel Cup Series season and the inaugural iteration of the event. The race was held on Saturday, April 23, 2005, in Avondale, Arizona at Phoenix International Raceway, a 1-mile (1.6 km) permanent low-banked tri-oval race track. The race took the scheduled 312 laps to complete. At race's end, Roush Racing driver Kurt Busch would dominate the majority of the race to take his 12th career NASCAR Nextel Cup Series victory and his first victory of the season. To fill out the top three, Dale Earnhardt, Inc. driver Michael Waltrip and Richard Childress Racing driver Jeff Burton would finish second and third, respectively.

Background 

Phoenix International Raceway – also known as PIR – is a one-mile, low-banked tri-oval race track located in Avondale, Arizona. It is named after the nearby metropolitan area of Phoenix. The motorsport track opened in 1964 and currently hosts two NASCAR race weekends annually. PIR has also hosted the IndyCar Series, CART, USAC and the Rolex Sports Car Series. The raceway is currently owned and operated by International Speedway Corporation.

The raceway was originally constructed with a 2.5 mi (4.0 km) road course that ran both inside and outside of the main tri-oval. In 1991 the track was reconfigured with the current 1.51 mi (2.43 km) interior layout. PIR has an estimated grandstand seating capacity of around 67,000. Lights were installed around the track in 2004 following the addition of a second annual NASCAR race weekend.

Entry list 

 (R) denotes rookie driver.

Practice

First practice 
The first practice session was held on Thursday, April 21, at 5:55 PM EST. The session would last for one hour.

Final practice 
The final practice session, sometimes referred to as Happy Hour, was held on Thursday, April 21, at 9:15 PM EST. The session would last for 45 minutes.

Qualifying 
Qualifying was held on Friday, April 22, at 6:00 PM EST. Positions 1-42 would be decided by time, while the 43rd position would be given to a past champion who had not otherwise qualified. If no past champion needed it, the next team in owner's points would earn the spot. Also, if a team in the top 35 in owner's points had missed qualifying in the top 35, they would earn a spot between 36-42 if needed.

Three drivers would fail to qualify.

Full qualifying results

Race results

References 

2005 NASCAR Nextel Cup Series
NASCAR races at Phoenix Raceway
April 2005 sports events in the United States
2005 in sports in Arizona